The NAB Radio Show is an annual trade show produced by the National Association of Broadcasters.  It takes place in September.

Show highlights

2008 
The 2008 NAB Radio Show took place in Austin, TX from September 17–19. NAB President and CEO David Rehr delivered the state of the industry address, which was followed by a keynote address from New York Times Personal Technology Columnist David Pogue. Other keynote speakers included FCC Commissioner Jonathan Adelstein and FCC Chairman Kevin Martin.

External links
 2008 NAB Radio Show

Radio organizations in the United States